Angela Fusco is a Canadian actress.

Early life and education 
Fusco was born in Toronto in 1944. She earned a bachelor's degree in English from the University of Toronto.

Career
The daughter of violinist Frank (Francesco) Fusco, she began her career as a child doing programs for children and adults on CBC Radio and television. In her teens, she spent three seasons at the Stratford Festival gaining experience under directors such as Michael Langham and Jean Gascon, and working with Douglas Rain, John Colicos and Kate Reid. After graduating from university, Angela performed in theatres, including the National Arts Centre, the Royal Alexandra Theatre, Theatre Calgary, Alberta Theatre Projects, the Citadel Theatre, Sudbury Theatre Centre and Young People’s Theatre. She played Alicia in Lady Audley’s Secret at the Shaw Festival.

Her mezzo soprano voice has brought her roles in musical theatre, including the Dora Award-winning Colette, The Colours of Love, which was written especially for her. Angela also garnered acclaim playing Mother Superior in Nunsense, and ran for nine months in the hit 1940s revue, Blue Champagne. As well as a season at the Blyth Festival in 1995, some of her Toronto theatre appearances include the Actors Repertory Company’s 2003 Dora Award-winning production of Edward Bond’s The Sea and a remount of the 2002 Fringe Festival hit The Terrible False Deception.

For four years Angela hosted the CBC classical music program Listen to the Music. She also hosted Music for an Afternoon on CJRT, and has appeared as guest host on the CBC radio programs Sunday Morning, Stereo Morning, Saturday Afternoon at the Opera, and Arts National.
Fusco has done television and radio commercials and narrations, including TVO's Read All About It!. She was the voice of Mrs. Claus in the 2018 animated feature Elliot the Littlest Reindeer.

Fusco combined her theatrical and musical abilities to perform narration with music for several projects with Peggy Hills’s Chamber Music Society of Mississauga. These have included A Butterfly in Time, The Little Mermaid and The Snow Queen all of which were recorded. A Butterfly in Time was nominated for a Juno Award in 2005.

Her later career film and television credits include Alliance Atlantis’s The Morrison Murders and an episode of The Listener. Angela has also played principal roles in The Third Miracle with Ed Harris, Focus with William H. Macy, and in New Blood with John Hurt.

Filmography

Film

Television

References

External links

1944 births
Living people
Canadian film actresses
Canadian television actresses
Canadian voice actresses
Canadian stage actresses